Matteo Pacelli (died 1731), born in Basilicata, was an Italian historical painter.

Biography
He studied under Luca Giordano. He traveled with Giordano to Spain, and later returned to Naples with a pension.

References

Year of birth unknown
1731 deaths
17th-century Italian painters
Italian male painters
18th-century Italian painters
Painters from Naples
Italian Baroque painters
Place of birth missing
18th-century Italian male artists